The Tommy Banks Show is a Canadian variety and talk show television series which aired on CBC Television from 1971 to 1974.

Premise
This Edmonton-produced series was recorded in the Student Union Theatre at the University of Alberta, featuring guests from Canada and other nations. On one episode, the visitors were musician Bruce Cockburn and nutritionist Adelle Davis. The series was broadcast locally in Edmonton until it was distributed nationally on CBC in 1971. Some guests have included leaders from the Church of Satan and the Canadian operations of the Ku Klux Klan.

Scheduling
This series was broadcast over three seasons as follows:

References

External links

 

CBC Television original programming
Television shows filmed in Edmonton
1971 Canadian television series debuts
1974 Canadian television series endings
1970s Canadian television talk shows
1970s Canadian variety television series